Anastasia Slutskaya, also known as Princess Slutskaya, is a 2003 historical drama film by Belarusfilm Production Company.

Plot 
The action takes place in the early 16th century. The Tatars attacked the prosperous Belarusian lands located at the intersection of trade routes, which were part of the Grand Duchy of Lithuania. The Crimean Tatar cavalry raided all Belarusian cities without exception. The aggressors stormed fortresses, robbed and enslaved the locals leaving behind only ashes.

However, the Tatars have to face the army squad and brave residents of Slutsk, who have not been defeated yet. The defenders are led by Princess Anastasia Slutskaya after the death of her husband, Prince Semen Olelkovich (1505).

Cast 
 Svetlana Zelenkovskaya – Anastasia Slutskaya
 Gennadiy Davydko – Semen Olelkovich 
 Anatoly Kot – Knight Vladimir Drutskiy

Voice-over 
Anastasia Slutskaya – Lubov Germanova

Production Unit  
 Director: Yuri Yelkhov
 Writer: Anatoli Delendik
 Camera: Tatyana Loginova (Tulusheva)
 Music: Victor Copytsko
 Production designer: Valeriy Nazarov

Awards 
 International Film Festival of historical films "Veche" (Veliky Novgorod, Russia, August 2003): Jury Diploma and Faith Award.
 The 6th International Film Festival "Brigantina" (Berdyansk, Ukraine, September 2003):
 Diploma and Jury Prize in the Best Film category to director Yuri Elkhov
 Jury Prize in the Best Supporting Male Role category to Anatoly Kot
 Jury Prize in the Best Debut category to Svetlana Zelenkovskaya
 Listapad Festival Grand Prix, Belarus
 The 37th Houston International Film Festival (Houston, Texas, USA, April 2004): Platinum Prize and a diploma in the Adventure film category
 State Prize 2005 of the Federation of Belarusian Trade Unions in the field of literature, art, and cinematography: Medal and Laureate Diploma.
 Hangzhou International Film Festival (China, October 2006): Crystal Jellyfish Prize.

References

External links 
  
 
 «Анастасия Слуцкая» на сайте kinopark.by 
 «Княгиня Слуцкая» на сайте RUSKINO.RU

Belarusian-language films
Films set in the 16th century
Belarusfilm films
Belarusian drama films